The 2021–22 EML season (also known as the Coolbet Hokiliiga for sponsorship reasons) was the 82nd season of the Meistriliiga, the top level of ice hockey in Estonia. The season began on 25 September 2021.

Teams

Regular season

League table

Results

Play-offs

Semi-finals

Third place

Finals

Final rankings

References

External links 
 Official website
 Season on hockeyarchives.info 

Estonia
2021–22 in Estonian ice hockey
Meistriliiga (ice hockey) seasons